Oghi is a town in District Mansehra of the Khyber Pakhtunkhwa province of Pakistan. Situated in the Agror Valley, it is the headquarters of the eponymous tehsil.

History
During British rule it was the headquarters of the Agror valley (part of Hazara District) and served as the headquarters of the Hazara border military police.

In British colonial times, the town of Oghi, in the Agror valley, was the seat of the local chief, the Khan of Agror, of the Pashton tribe, descended from one Akhund Saadudin. Following the disturbances by The Black Mountain (Tor Ghar) Tribes and campaign of 1888 this chiefdom was formally abolished by the government of British India; and subsequently, the chiefs were given a limited 'Jagir' grant in exile. In the post-independence era, this family has been represented in Pakistani politics by the late Khan Fakhar uz Zaman Khan, and then his wife Senator Mrs. Fauzia Fakhar uz Zaman, and their son, Mr. Wajih uz Zaman Khan, Advocate, who is an MP in the Provincial Assembly of Khyber-Pakhtoonkhwa.

References

Union councils of Mansehra District
Populated places in Mansehra District